KQNA (1130 AM) is an American radio station licensed to serve Prescott and Prescott Valley, Arizona, United States. The station is owned by the Prescott Valley Broadcasting Co. (d/b/a Arizona's Hometown Radio Group). It airs a news-talk-sports radio format.

The station was assigned the "KQNA" call sign by the Federal Communications Commission on January 12, 1994.

KQNA operates two FM translators. 10-watt K260BL on 99.9 MHz came into service in 2009; it is aimed at downtown Prescott and broadcasts from southwest of the city. 250-watt K238CB on 95.5 broadcasts from Mingus Mountain toward Prescott Valley and Cottonwood and was acquired from Advance Ministries in 2016.

Programming includes Talk of the Town which features local hosts from Chino Valley on Mondays, Prescott Valley on Tuesdays, Prescott on Wednesdays and Cottonwood/The Roundtable on Thursdays at 4pm Arizona time.  In addition to local news, KQNA also serves as exclusive outlets for several national conservative talk programs such as Dennis Prager, Sebastian Gorka, Ben Shapiro, Mark Levin, Brandon Tatum, Hugh Hewitt and Brian Kilmeade.

Saturday and Sunday mornings feature two top local radio shows.  Hammer Time, produced and hosted by Sandy Griffis for the Yavapai County Contractors Association at 7am and The Mountain Gardener, produced by Ken Lain at Watters Garden Center.

KQNA is a member of the Prescott, Prescott Valley, Chino Valley, Cottonwood-Verde Valley and Flagstaff Chambers of Commerce as well as a member of the Prescott Downtown Partnership.

References

External links
 KQNA official website

 
 

QNA
News and talk radio stations in the United States
Mass media in Yavapai County, Arizona
Radio stations established in 1986
1986 establishments in Arizona
QNA